The A661 is an A road running between Wetherby and Harrogate (via Spofforth) in West and North Yorkshire, England.

The A661 begins in West Yorkshire at the South Wetherby roundabout (adjacent to The Mercure Hotel) where it intersects with the A58 (St Helens to Wetherby via Leeds, Bradford and Halifax) and slip roads for the A1.

The A661 finishes at the Empress roundabout in Harrogate, where it intersects with the A6040 towards the town centre, and A59, towards Knaresborough and York in one direction and Skipton in the other.

Roads in Yorkshire
Transport in North Yorkshire
Borough of Harrogate